Degania Alef is a kibbutz in northern Israel. The Jewish communal settlement (kvutza) started off in 1910, making it the earliest socialist Zionist farming commune in the Land of Israel. Its status as "the mother of all kibbutzim" is sometimes contested based on a later distinction made between the smaller kvutza, applying to Degania in its beginnings, and the larger kibbutz.

It falls under the jurisdiction of the Emek HaYarden Regional Council. Degania Alef and its neighbor Degania Bet both lie between the southern shore of the Sea of Galilee and the Jordan River.

Etymology 
Degania means "cornflower" and is derived from דגן dagán, meaning "grain". After the first phase at Umm Junieh, the group and its settlement was simply called Degania, Alef being added only after the establishment of the associated kibbutzim of Degania Bet and Gimel in 1920. Alef, bet and gimel are the first letters of the Hebrew alphabet and carry the numerical values 1, 2 and 3.

History

Roman period
According to the 1881 Survey of Western Palestine, Umm Junieh was possibly the place called Union, or Homonœa, by Josephus (Vita, 54).

Ottoman period

Umm Junieh village
The Muslim village called Umm Junieh is mentioned during the Late Ottoman period (late 19th century) at the site from which the first Jewish settlers would start establishing their community in 1909–1910. A map from Napoleon's invasion of 1799 by Pierre Jacotin showed the place as ruined. Umm Junieh was just by the ancient bridge known in Arabic as Jisr es-Sidd, which was also noted as ruined by Jacotin.

In 1875, Victor Guérin observed the village of Oumm Djouneh, sitting on a hill east of the river Jordan. In 1881, the PEF's Survey of Western Palestine (SWP) described the place, cited as Umm Junieh, as a stone and adobe village, on the east side of the river Jordan, on the top of the eastern bank of the river. It contained about 250 Muslim inhabitants. All the plain around was arable soil; no trees. A mill was worked at the village. A population list from about 1887 showed that Umm Juny had about 330 inhabitants, all Muslim.

Beginnings

At Umm Juni
Degania (later Degania Alef) was the first kvutza-type agricultural settlement established by Zionist pioneers of the New Yishuv under Ottoman rule. The location was south-west of the Sea of Galilee, at a place known in Arabic as Umm Junieh or Umm Juni, within the administrative Ottoman area of Acre Sanjak. It was founded in 1910 by a group of eight men and a one woman, the "[labour] conquest group", followed at the end of the same year by what would become the permanent settlers group (ten men and two women).

At permanent location
In June 1912, the group moved from the mud huts and wooden shack of Umm Juni to the new stone-built compound at its permanent location. That is at the place where the Jordan River emerges from the Sea of Galilee and therefore had the Arabic name Bab al-Tumm, "Gate of the Mouth".

Prominent early members
The poetess Rachel Bluwstein, the "prophet of labor" A. D. Gordon, and paramilitary commander and leading Zionist Joseph Trumpeldor all worked at Degania Alef. Zionist pioneer and future Israeli politician Yosef Baratz was among the founders of Degania Alef. On June 5, 1912, he married and started the first family. His first child, Gideon Baratz (1913–1988), who was born in Degania Alef, was the first child born in a Jewish collective community in Palestine. The second child to be born in Degania Alef was the prominent Israeli general and politician Moshe Dayan. Dayan was named after Moshe Barsky, a member of Degania Alef who was the first kibbutz member killed in an Arab attack. Barsky was killed in November 1913. He was alone in the kibbutz fields when he was shot in the back and left for dead by Arab marauders.

British mandate
In 1920 two new kibbutzim, Degania Bet and Degania Gimel, were established to the south of what consequently became Degania Alef or Aleph.

By 1947 Degania Alef had a population of 380.

State of Israel

On May 20, 1948, during the Battles of the Kinarot Valley, in one of the first battles of the 1948 Arab–Israeli War, the residents of Degania Alef and Bet, assisted by a small number of military personnel, repelled a Syrian attack and succeeded in halting the advance of the Syrian army into the Jordan Valley. During the attack Degania Alef was completely destroyed by the Syrian army. According to a 1949 book by the Jewish National Fund, the village was destroyed following attacks on the neighboring kibbutzim of Sha'ar HaGolan and Masada. The settlers resisted, however, and launched a counter-attack which helped to recover the neighboring settlements. Reconstruction started almost immediately.

Economy
In 2007, Degania Alef moved to undergo privatisation. Instead of assigned jobs and equal pay under the former communal economy, the reorganisation requires members to find employment, live on their income, and allows them to own their homes, but still offers a form of a social "safety net" supplement for members whose livelihood is inadequate to meet their expenses. This move to privatisation was chronicled in Yitzhak Rubin's 2008 documentary, Degania: The First Kibbutz Fights Its Last Battle.

Awards and recognition
In 1981, Kvutza Degania Alef was awarded the Israel Prize, for its special contribution to society and the State in social pioneering.

Notable people
 Yosef Baratz (1890–1968), one of the founders; Zionist activist and Israeli politician
 Rachel Bluwstein (a.k.a. "Rachel the Poetess"; 1890–1931), national poet
 Moshe Dayan (1915–1981), military man and politician; second child born here
 A. D. Gordon (1856–1922), Zionist ideologist (the "prophet of labor") and pioneer
 Joseph Trumpeldor (1880–1920), Zionist leader, army officer

See also
Arthur Ruppin
Kinneret Farm
Second Aliyah
Romny, the hometown of three of the 1909 "conquest group" at Umm Juni

References

Bibliography

Further reading

External links

Official website
A Day in Degania, 15-minute colour film shot by Lazar Dünner in 1937 for documentary and propaganda purposes, narrated in English. On YouTube, from the Spielberg Jewish Film Archive (accessed April 30, 2020).
 

Kibbutzim
Kibbutz Movement
Israel Prize for special contribution to society and the State recipients
Israel Prize recipients that are organizations
Populated places established in 1909
Jewish villages in the Ottoman Empire
Jewish villages in Mandatory Palestine
Populated places in Northern District (Israel)
1909 establishments in the Ottoman Empire
Sea of Galilee